The Lithosiina are a subtribe of lichen moths in the family Erebidae. The taxon was erected by Gustaf Johan Billberg in 1820.

Taxonomy
The subtribe used to be classified as the tribe Lithosiini of the subfamily Lithosiinae of the family Arctiidae.

Genera
The following genera are included in the subtribe.  

Aedoea
Agylla
Apaidia
Apistosia
Asiapistosia
Atolmis
Blaviodes
Brunia
Bucsekia
Calamidia
Capissa
Chrysorabdia
Chrysoscota
Collita
Crambidia
Cybosia
Danielithosia
Denteilema
Dolgoma
Eilema
Euconosia
Gampola
Gandhara
Gardinia
Ghoria
Gnamptonychia
Graphosia
Hesudra
Hyposhada
Inopsis
Katha
Lambula
Lambulodes
Lithosia
Macotasa
Macrobrochis
Mantala
Manulea
Microlithosia
Mithuna
Monosyntaxis
Muscula
Neosyntaxis
Nishada
Oeonistis
Oeonosia
Palaeosia
Papuasyntaxis
Paraona
Pelosia
Planovalvata
Poliosia
Prabhasa
Pseudoscaptia
Scoliacma
Scoliosia
Semicalamidia
Sozusa
Striosia
Tarika
Teratopora
Teulisna
Thysanoptyx
Tigrioides
Tylanthes
Vamuna
Wittia
Zadadra
Zobida

References 

 
Lepidoptera subtribes